The Battle of Midway was a World War II battle.

The Battle of Midway may also refer to:
The Battle of Midway (film), 1942 documentary about the battle
Midway (1976 film), also known as Battle of Midway and The Battle of Midway, 1976 film about the battle
1943: The Battle of Midway, 1987 shoot 'em up arcade game based on the actual battle.
Battle of Midway (horse) (2014–2019), Thoroughbred racehorse
Midway (2019 film), a 2019 film about the battle

See also
Midway (disambiguation)